On August 2, 1813, Representative John Gloninger (F) of Pennsylvania's  resigned his seat.  A special election to fill this vacancy was held on October 12, 1813.  This was the first of two special elections held in the 3rd district in the 13th Congress (the 3rd district was a plural district with two seats).

Election results

Crouch took his seat on December 6, 1813.  With Gloninger's resignation, Pennsylvania had no Federalist representatives in Congress until the special elections in 1814 in the 2nd and 3rd districts both replaced Democratic-Republicans by Federalists.

See also
List of special elections to the United States House of Representatives

References

Pennsylvania 1813 03
Pennsylvania 1813 03
1813 03
Pennsylvania 03
United States House of Representatives 03
United States House of Representatives 1813 03
August 1813 events